Core collapse can refer to:
 The collapse of the stellar core of a massive star, such as the core collapse that produces a supernova
 Core collapse (cluster), the dynamic process that leads to a concentration of stars at the core of a globular cluster